Vsevobuch, a portmanteau for "Universal Military Training", was a system of compulsory military training for men practiced in the Russian SFSR governed by the Chief Administration of Universal Military Training of the People's Commissariat of Military Affairs.

The first vsevobuch was urged by the 7th Congress of the Bolshevik Party. It took place de jure in March 1918 to fight the remnants of opposition to Soviet rule. Initially Vsevobuch engaged mainly the workers; from that summer, it also took poor peasants. Ippolit Sokolov's Sistema trudovoi gimnastiki was published in 1922. The whole process was canceled in 1923.  

Shortly after the opening of the Eastern Front of World War II a decree of the State Defense Committee was issued on September 17, 1941. Named "On Universal Compulsory Military Training of the Citizens of the USSR", it came into force on October 1 of the same year and concerned males between 16 and 50 years old. The document proclaimed that military training should be provided without isolation from civilian work. The Central Department of Vsevobuch was formed within the People's Commissariat of Defense.

It is estimated that the total number who passed through Vsevobuch in 1941–45 was 9,862,000 men.

A  mountain in Trans-Ili Alatau was named after Vsevobuch.

See also
All-Union Council on physical culture and sports
CSKA Moscow
OSOAVIAKhIM
Morning Exercises
Roza Shanina

References

Soviet phraseology
Military history of the Soviet Union
Military education and training in the Soviet Union
1918 establishments in Russia
1923 disestablishments
1941 establishments in the Soviet Union
1945 disestablishments